Hedgardo Marín Arroyo (born 21 February 1993) is a Mexican professional footballer who plays as a centre-back.

Club career

Guadalajara
Marin joined Guadalajara's youth academy in 2008. He continued through Chivas Youth Academy successfully playing through Chivas ranks from U-17 and U-20. Until finally reaching the first team, Ricardo La Volpe being the coach promoting Marin to first team in 2013.

He made his official debut under Argentine coach Ricardo La Volpe as a starter in a game against Monterrey on 27 April 2014 which he played all 90 minutes.

Zacatecas

FC Juárez
On 10 July 2020 it was announced that Marin would join FC Juárez on loan for one year.

International career

Youth
Marín captained the squad that participated in the 2013 FIFA U-20 World Cup in Turkey.

Senior
Marín got his first call up to the senior Mexico side for matches against New Zealand and Panama in October 2016.

Career statistics

International

International goals
Scores and results list Mexico's goal tally first.

Honours
Guadalajara
Liga MX: Clausura 2017
Copa MX: Apertura 2015, Clausura 2017
Supercopa MX: 2016
CONCACAF Champions League: 2018

Mexico Youth
CONCACAF U-20 Championship: 2013
Central American and Caribbean Games: 2014
Pan American Silver Medal: 2015
CONCACAF Olympic Qualifying Championship: 2015

References

External links
 Hedgardo Marín Arroyo at Chivas de Corazón 
 
  
 
 

1993 births
Living people
Mexico under-20 international footballers
C.D. Guadalajara footballers
Mineros de Zacatecas players
FC Juárez footballers
Liga MX players
Ascenso MX players
Footballers from Guadalajara, Jalisco
Footballers at the 2015 Pan American Games
Association football central defenders
Pan American Games medalists in football
Pan American Games silver medalists for Mexico
Mexico international footballers
2017 CONCACAF Gold Cup players
Mexican footballers
Central American and Caribbean Games gold medalists for Mexico
Central American and Caribbean Games medalists in football
Competitors at the 2014 Central American and Caribbean Games
Medalists at the 2015 Pan American Games
21st-century Mexican people